Nipawin Water Aerodrome  is located  north of Nipawin, Saskatchewan, Canada.

See also 
 Nipawin Airport
 List of airports in Saskatchewan
 List of defunct airports in Canada

References 

Defunct seaplane bases in Saskatchewan
Torch River No. 488, Saskatchewan